Tidwell Prairie is an unincorporated community in Robertson County, Texas, United States. Tidwell Prairie is eight miles northeast of Calvert. The community was founded after the Civil War by residents of Owensville; it was most likely named after Tidwell's Creek. Tidwell Prairie had two schools in 1942 and a church and a school in the 1970s and 1980s.

References

Unincorporated communities in Robertson County, Texas
Unincorporated communities in Texas
Bryan–College Station